Casper Hoogenraad is a Dutch Cell Biologist who specializes in molecular neuroscience. The focus of his research is the basic molecular and cellular mechanisms that regulate the development and function of the brain. As of January 2020, he serves as Vice President of Neuroscience at Genentech Research and Early Development.

Biography and research
Casper Hoogenraad was born in 1973 in Delft and grew up in Gouda, in The Netherlands. He received his B.S. in Biochemistry and M.S. in Molecular Biology from Utrecht University, and his doctorate in Cell Biology from the Erasmus University Rotterdam. In 2002, Hoogenraad started his post-doctoral research at Massachusetts Institute of Technology in Cambridge, USA. In 2005, he returned to the Netherlands and joined the faculty of the Erasmus University Medical Center in Rotterdam as Associate Professor in the Department of Neuroscience. In 2011 he joined Utrecht University as full Professor of Molecular Neuroscience, and served as Chair of Cell Biology, Neurobiology and Biophysics for 10 years. He is Adjunct Professor in Department of Biochemistry and Biophysics at University of California San Francisco (UCSF).

During his career, he discovered molecular mechanisms and cell biological processes that control cytoskeleton remodeling and cargo trafficking during the development and function of the brain.

Selected publications

Industrial career

Hoogenraad was recruited to Genentech, a member of the Roche Group, as Senior Fellow and head of Neuroscience. As of January 2020, he is Vice President of Neuroscience at Genentech Research and Early Development. In this role, he is Head of the Neuroscience Department, responsible for research and drug discovery activities in Neuroscience and oversees Genentech’s Neuroscience disease pipeline programs.

Honors
He is an elected member of the European Molecular Biology Organization, The Young Academy’ of the Royal Netherlands Academy of Sciences, Young Academy of Europe  and the Editorial Board of Neuron and The EMBO Journal. In 2016 he became the 10th recipient of the IBRO-Kemali Prize, in the field of basic and clinical Neuroscience. Some of his awards: NWO Talent stipendium, Human Frontiers Long-Term Fellowship, European Younng Investigators (EURYI) award, Dutch Innovational Research VIDI and VICI, European Research Council (ERC) - consolidator grant.

Science outreach
In 2013, his laboratory made an animation movie, named 'A Day in the Life of a Motor Protein', which has received >1 million views on youtube. During this short five-minute movie, we follow John, a motor protein, who has to transport a large package through the narrow streets in the city of Utrecht, illustrating the importance and challenges of intracellular transport.

References 

1973 births
Living people
Cell biologists
21st-century Dutch biologists
People from Gouda, South Holland
People from Delft
Erasmus University Rotterdam alumni
Utrecht University alumni
Academic staff of Erasmus University Rotterdam
Members of the European Molecular Biology Organization